Playgroup may refer to:

 Pre-school playgroup, a kind of pre-school care
Playgroup (band), a British dance act